Kyrene School District is a K-8 school district that serves parts of Tempe, Chandler, Guadalupe, and Phoenix, Arizona, as well as portions of the Gila River Indian Community within Maricopa County. Kyrene School District operates a total of 26 schools, consisting of nineteen elementary schools, six middle schools and one online school. The District Office Administration Building of the Kyrene School District (known as the Ben Furlong Education Center) is located at 8700 S Kyrene Rd, Tempe, Arizona 85284.

History
In 1888, the Kyrene School District was founded at the request of nine families who wanted a school district for 17 children. The original boundary area was far smaller than currently; though the north boundary is unchanged, the Kyrene district confirmed its east boundary at Price Road and has since extended west from its 56th Street/Priest Drive boundary and south from Pecos Road to include much of the Gila River Indian Community.
The district built a small school that was destroyed in a windstorm; until 1920, the Kyrene School site was at McClintock and Warner roads, two miles due east of the Furlong Center (a 1990 build).

Many teachers who received their educational certificates from Arizona State University, originally called Tempe Normal School, taught in one of the two-schoolroom buildings. Mr. Earl D. Willams graduated from Arizona State University and began teaching Industrial Art at the Kyrene Junior High K-8 on Warner and Kyrene Rd.  Mr. Williams built the first Industrial Art Shop-Class, the Library and the Administration Building.  He also built a replica of the original school house for the Kyrene Bicentennial Parade. Mr. Earl Williams taught Industrial Art for thirty years at Kyrene.

Kyrene approached the early 1970s with 600 students in the entire district, mostly Hispanic students from a small area named "Sende Vista", just south of Guadalupe, an area of South Phoenix called "Highland Terrace", and the Hightown neighborhood of Chandler. Five buses transported the districts to school.

Resources in the '70s were concentrated on building classroom space for the district that would grow fourfold by 1980. C.I. Waggoner elementary was expanded, and the District completed Lomas and Norte elementary schools.  (C.I. Waggoner Elementary School, est. 1969, is the oldest operating school facility in the district.)

The 1980s brought another wave of new schools, built in mostly the same designs. Nine elementary and middle schools were built in the 1980s, and thirteen more followed by the late 1990s, bringing the District to a total of 25 schools. 

In August of 2020, amidst the COVID-19 pandemic, the District launched it's 26th school (Kyrene's first completely on-line school) known as the Kyrene Digital Academy. The Kyrene Digital Academy is a K-8 school serving students from all over Arizona (not just within the Kyrene boundaries). Instruction is delivered one hundred percent online using live certified teachers. 

DISTRICT EXECUTIVE LEADERSHIP 
Superintendent - Laura Toenjes 
Chief Financial Officer - Chris Herrmann 
Executive Director of School Effectiveness - Carrie Furedy 
Executive Director of Talent Management - Lisa Gibson 
Executive Director of Information Technology & Emergency Management - Damian Nichols 
Executive Director of Curriculum and Assessment - Dr. Christie Mc Dougall 
Executive Director of Accountability & Performance Management - Dr. Susie Ostmeyer
Executive Director of Inclusive Student Services - Dr. Sandra Laine 
Executive Director of Communications & Marketing - Erin Helm 

DISTRICT DIRECTORS 
Director of Business Services - Brian Lockery 
Director of Community Education - Josh Glider 
Director of Professional Development- Dr. Jo Shurman 
Director of Research and Evaluation - Dr. Rebecca Bolnick
Director of Transportation & Facilities - Eric Nethercutt 
Director of Exceptional Student Services - Tzipi Turner

Middle schools

Centennial and Pueblo opened as junior high schools and were converted to full 6-8 middle schools in 1990. Kyrene MS opened as a junior high and was converted to a full 6-8 middle school in 1989.

Elementary schools

C. I. Waggoner Elementary School, est.1969
Kyrene del Norte Elementary School, est. 1974 
Kyrene de las Lomas Elementary School, est. 1976
Kyrene del Cielo Elementary School, est.1982
Kyrene de los Ninos Elementary School, est. 1982
Kyrene de la Paloma Elementary School, est. 1985
Kyrene de la Colina Elementary School, est. 1987
Kyrene Traditional Academy-Sureño Campus, est. 1987
Kyrene de los Lagos Elementary School, est. 1988
Kyrene de la Mariposa Elementary School, est. 1988
Kyrene Monte Vista Elementary School, est.1989
Kyrene de la Sierra Elementary School, est. 1992
Kyrene de la Esperanza Elementary School, est. 1993
Kyrene de la Mirada Elementary School, est. 1993
Kyrene de las Brisas Elementary School, est.1994
Kyrene de los Cerritos Elementary School, est.1994
Kyrene de las Manitas Elementary School, est. 1996
Kyrene de la Estrella Elementary School, est. 1999
Kyrene del Milenio Elementary School, est. 2000

Notes

References

External links 
 Official website

School districts in Phoenix, Arizona
School districts in Maricopa County, Arizona
Education in Chandler, Arizona
Education in Tempe, Arizona
1888 establishments in Arizona Territory
School districts established in 1888